The Forgotten Latchkey is an American silent comedy film.

Plot
Mr. and Mrs. Burton are staying at the residence of their friends the Moores.  The Moores leave to visit Mrs. Moore's mother, and leave a key for the Burtons, who are going out to a dance.  Mrs. Burton forgets to take the key with her, and upon their return to the Moore residence, find that they are unable to gain entry, nor are they able to rouse the slumberous maid Bridget.  They attempt to enter the house through the cellar, but the door to the kitchen is locked.  Further attempts to rouse the maid are futile.  They attempt to go to a hotel, but are not admitted.  The Burtons end up hiring a taxicab and spending the night in the car, as it is too frigid to walk around outdoors.  When the Moore's cook arrives at the house the next morning, she finds the Burtons asleep in the taxi, and believes them to be deceased.  Her screams awake the Burtons, and they are finally admitted to the inside of the residence, but not before paying the taxi driver $17.

Cast
Harry Morey as Mr. Burton
Anita Stewart as Mrs. Burton
George Randolph as Mr. Moore
Edith Storey as Mrs. Moore
Josie Sadler as Bridget, the Maid
Florence Ashbrooke as Maggie, the Cook
James Lackaye as Pat, a Policeman

Release
The Forgotten Latchkey was released in the United States on June 7, 1913, and on September 15, 1913, in England.

References

External links
 

1913 films
1910s romantic comedy films
American romantic comedy films
American black-and-white films
American silent short films
1913 comedy films
Films directed by Ralph Ince
1910s American films
Silent romantic comedy films
Silent American comedy films